Zurab Menteshashvili (born 30 January 1980) is a former football midfielder from Georgia.

Club career
Menteshashvili previously played for FC Spartak Alania, FC Shinnik Yaroslavl in the Russian Premier League and FK Ventspils in Virsliga.

Playing career

* - played games and goals

Awards
 Champion of Latvia (8) - 1999, 2000, 2001, 2002, 2003, 2004, 2007, 2008.
 Israel State Cup (1) - 2010
 Israeli Premier League - 2010

References

External links
 
 
 

1980 births
People from Rustavi
Living people
Footballers from Georgia (country)
Georgia (country) international footballers
Expatriate footballers from Georgia (country)
Association football midfielders
FC Shinnik Yaroslavl players
FK Ventspils players
Skonto FC players
FC Spartak Vladikavkaz players
Expatriate footballers in Latvia
Hapoel Tel Aviv F.C. players
Expatriate footballers in Israel
Expatriate sportspeople from Georgia (country) in Latvia
Expatriate sportspeople from Georgia (country) in Israel
Israeli Premier League players
Russian Premier League players
FC Metalurgi Rustavi players
FC WIT Georgia players
Expatriate footballers in Russia
Hapoel Ashkelon F.C. players
FC Zestafoni players
FC Saburtalo Tbilisi players
Expatriate sportspeople from Georgia (country) in Russia
Erovnuli Liga players